Steve Moyers (born September 23, 1956 in St. Louis, Missouri) is a retired soccer forward from the United States, who was a member of the American squad that competed at the 1984 Summer Olympics in Los Angeles, California.  He spent eight seasons in the North American Soccer League, one in the Major Indoor Soccer League and one in the American Indoor Soccer Association.

Professional
Moyers grew up in Saint Louis and attended the University of Missouri-St. Louis where he spent one season, 1976, on the men's soccer team.  In 1977, he attended a walk on trial with the St. Louis Stars of the North American Soccer League (NASL).  He made the team, but saw time in only three regular-season games.  At the end of the 1977 season, the Stars moved to Los Angeles and became the California Surf.  Moyers moved with the team and saw his appearances rapidly increase.  At the end of the 1981 season the Surf folded and the New York Cosmos purchased his contract. When the NASL collapsed after the 1984 outdoor season, the Cosmos moved to the Major Indoor Soccer League (MISL).  However, the team folded just after halfway through the 1984–1985 season.  Moyers then moved to the St. Louis Steamers of MISL.  After scoring only once in eleven games, Moyers was released.  He then moved first to the Canton Invaders of the American Indoor Soccer Association (AISA), then the Milwaukee Wave (AISA) for the 1985–1986 season.  At the end of that season, he retired from playing professional soccer.

National team
Moyers earned a total number of seven caps for the US between 1980 and 1984.  He scored two goals, both in a 2–1 victory over Mexico on November 23, 1980.  That was the first U.S. victory over Mexico in 46 years.

In 1984, Moyers was selected for the U.S. soccer team at the 1984 Summer Olympics in Los Angeles.  The U.S. went 1-1-1 and failed to make the second round.

On October 14, 1982, Moyers visited the White House along with Pelé for a soccer promotional visit with President Ronald Reagan.

References

External links
 Excellent bio by American soccer historian Steve Holroyd

1956 births
Living people
American Indoor Soccer Association players
American soccer players
Association football forwards
California Surf players
Canton Invaders players
Louisville Thunder players
UMSL Tritons men's soccer players
Major Indoor Soccer League (1978–1992) players
New York Cosmos players
North American Soccer League (1968–1984) indoor players
North American Soccer League (1968–1984) players
St. Louis Stars (soccer) players
Soccer players from St. Louis
St. Louis Steamers (original MISL) players
Olympic soccer players of the United States
Footballers at the 1984 Summer Olympics
United States men's international soccer players
Milwaukee Wave players